Walter Paye Lane (February 18, 1817 – January 28, 1892) was a Confederate general during the American Civil War who also served in the armies of the Republic of Texas and the United States of America.

Early life
Lane was born in County Cork, Ireland. The Lane family emigrated to Fairview in Guernsey County, Ohio, in 1821, and moved to Kentucky in 1825. In 1836 Lane moved to Texas to participate in its war for independence against Mexico. After Texas had gained its independence, Lane lived in San Augustine County in East Texas and then San Antonio, where he briefly served as a Texas Ranger. In 1846 Lane joined the 1st Regiment of Texas Mounted Rifle Volunteers as a first lieutenant to fight in the Mexican–American War. Lane fought with honors at the Battle of Monterrey and was later given the rank of major and command of his own battalion. After the Mexican–American War, Lane wandered about doing various things in Arizona, California, and Peru before opening a mercantile business in Marshall, Texas, in 1858.

Civil War
When the Civil War broke out, Lane was among the first Texans to call for secession. Lane's military reputation was so great that the first volunteer Confederate company raised in Harrison County was named for him, though Lane would join the 3rd Texas Cavalry. Lane participated in the battles of Wilson's Creek, Missouri, Chustenahlah, Pea Ridge and both the Siege of Corinth and Second Battle of Corinth. Lane led the 3rd Texas at the battle of Franklin, Mississippi, and was commended by General P.G.T. Beauregard for his efforts. Lane was severely wounded in the Battle of Mansfield in 1864, where Confederates forces rebuffed a push to capture either or both Shreveport, Louisiana, or Marshall, Texas. Before the war ended, Lane was promoted to the rank of brigadier general in 1865, being confirmed on the last day the Confederate Congress met.

Postbellum career
After the Civil War Lane returned to Marshall where he helped to establish the Texas Veterans Association. After Reconstruction, Lane and his brother George, a local judge, founded the first White Citizens Party in Texas and ran Republicans and African-Americans out of Marshall. With Democratic white hegemony brutally reestablished in Marshall and Harrison County, Lane declared the city and county "redeemed". He died in Marshall, Texas, and is buried in the Marshall Cemetery near downtown Marshall. His memoirs, The Adventures and Recollections of General Walter P. Lane, were published posthumously in 1928.

See also

 List of American Civil War generals (Confederate)

Notes

References
 Eicher, John H., and David J. Eicher, Civil War High Commands. Stanford: Stanford University Press, 2001. .
 Sifakis, Stewart. Who Was Who in the Civil War. New York: Facts On File, 1988. .
 Warner, Ezra J. Generals in Gray: Lives of the Confederate Commanders. Baton Rouge: Louisiana State University Press, 1959. .

External links
 

1817 births
1892 deaths
Confederate States Army generals
People of the Texas Revolution
People from Marshall, Texas
Members of the Texas Ranger Division
United States Army officers
Irish emigrants to the United States (before 1923)
Military personnel from San Antonio
People of Texas in the American Civil War
Irish soldiers in the Confederate States Army
People from Fairview, Ohio